Events in the year 1983 in Mexico.

Incumbents

Federal government 
 President: Miguel de la Madrid
 Interior Secretary (SEGOB): Manuel Bartlett Díaz
 Secretary of Foreign Affairs (SRE): Bernardo Sepúlveda Amor
 Communications Secretary (SCT): Rodolfo Félix Valdés
 Education Secretary (SEP): Manuel Bartlett
 Secretary of Defense (SEDENA): Juan Arévalo Gardoqui
 Secretary of Navy: Miguel Ángel Gómez Ortega
 Secretary of Labor and Social Welfare: Arsenio Farell Cubillas
 Secretary of Welfare: Guillermo Carrillo Arena
 Secretary of Public Education: Jesús Reyes Heroles
 Tourism Secretary (SECTUR): Carlos Hank González 
 Secretary of the Environment (SEMARNAT): Pedro Ojeda Paullada
 Secretary of Health (SALUD): Guillermo Soberón Acevedo

Supreme Court

 President of the Supreme Court: Jorge Iñárritu y Ramírez de Aguilar

Governors 

 Aguascalientes: Rodolfo Landeros Gallegos (PRI)
 Baja California
Roberto de la Madrid (PRI), until October 31
Xicoténcatl Leyva Mortera (PRI), starting November 1
 Baja California Sur: Alberto Andrés Alvarado Arámburo
 Campeche: Eugenio Echeverría Castellot
 Chiapas: Absalón Castellanos Domínguez
 Chihuahua: Oscar Ornelas
 Coahuila: José de las Fuentes Rodríguez
 Colima: Griselda Álvarez
 Durango: Armando del Castillo Franco
 Guanajuato: Enrique Velasco Ibarra
 Guerrero: Alejandro Cervantes Delgado
 Hidalgo: Guillermo Rossell de la Lama
 Jalisco: Flavio Romero de Velasco/Enrique Álvarez del Castillo
 State of Mexico: Alfredo del Mazo González
 Michoacán: Cuauhtémoc Cárdenas
 Morelos: Lauro Ortega Martínez
 Nayarit: Emilio Manuel González Parra
 Nuevo León: Alfonso Martínez Domínguez/Jorge Treviño
 Oaxaca: Pedro Vázquez Colmenares
 Puebla: Guillermo Jiménez Morales
 Querétaro: Rafael Camacho Guzmán
 Quintana Roo: Pedro Joaquín Coldwell
 San Luis Potosí: Carlos Jonguitud Barrios
 Sinaloa: Antonio Toledo Corro
 Sonora: Samuel Ocaña García
 Tabasco: Enrique González Pedrero
 Tamaulipas: Emilio Martínez Manautou	
 Tlaxcala: Tulio Hernández Gómez
 Veracruz: Agustín Acosta Lagunes
 Yucatán: Graciliano Alpuche Pinzón
 Zacatecas: José Guadalupe Cervantes Corona
Regent of Mexico City: Ramón Aguirre Velázquez

Events
 The Mexican company INEGI is founded.
 Mónica Rosas from Durango is crowned Señorita México by outgoing titleholder Alba Cervera. 
 Benedetti's Pizza is founded by Felipe Baeza.
 Galería OMR founded by its principals Patricia Ortiz Monasterio and Jaime Riestra.
 April 3 – The 2nd festival of the popular Juguemos a Cantar series begins; it ends five weeks later on May 1.
 August 23–29: Hurricane Barry. 
 December 2: The Mexico City Mexico Temple is founded.

Awards
Belisario Domínguez Medal of Honor – Jesús Silva Herzog

Film

 List of Mexican films of 1983

Sport

 1982–83 Mexican Primera División season
 1983 FIFA World Youth Championship 
 Football Club Chapulineros de Oaxacais founded. 
 September 4: Football Club Santos Laguna is founded.

Births
March 1 
Elán, singer-songwriter
Lupita Nyong'o, Mexican-Kenyan actress
March 9 — Maite Perroni, actress, singer, and model.
March 11 – Renato López, television presenter, actor, musician (d. November 23, 2016).
July 14 — Tomas Villa, featherweight boxer (d. 2018)
November 29 – Rubén Espinosa, photojournalist (Proceso and Cuartoscuro), (d. July 31, 2015).

Deaths
 April 11 - Dolores del Río, actress (b. 1904)
 May 14 – Miguel Alemán Valdés, 46th President of Mexico (b. 1903)

References

External links

 
Mexico